Ryan Gage (born 17 January 1983) is an English actor who has worked in theatre, television, films, and video games.

On television, he is best known for his roles as King Louis XIII in the BBC series The Musketeers and Ted Bundy in the TV film Serial Thriller: Angel of Decay. In the cinema, he played the Master of Laketown's deputy Alfrid Lickspittle in The Hobbit: The Desolation of Smaug and The Hobbit: The Battle of the Five Armies, and Ted Bundy again (identified as him in the cast list) in the film Angel of Decay, which earned him a Best Actor Award at the British Independent Film Festival in 2016. In video games, Gage has portrayed Charibert in the Final Fantasy XIV expansion pack Final Fantasy XIV: Heavensward. In theatre, he has worked for the Royal Shakespeare Company on plays such as Hamlet, A Midsummer Night's Dream, and Macbeth.

Theatre

TV and filmography

Feature films and shorts

Television series

Direct-to-video and television films

Video games

External links

References

Living people
English male film actors
English male voice actors
English male video game actors
English male television actors
English male stage actors
1983 births
Royal Shakespeare Company members